Serejaka Subregion is a subregion in the central Maekel region (Zoba Maekel) of Eritrea. Its capital lies at Serejaka.

References

Subregions of Eritrea

Central Region (Eritrea)
Subregions of Eritrea